Slow River Records was a Marblehead, Massachusetts-based independent record label.

History
Slow River Records was established by producer and musician George Howard in 1993. He operated it along with Anna Johansson. It obtained enough income and distribution capabilities to release its first record (a 7" by Desk) from singles released by Howard's band, the Lotus Eaters, on Harriet Records. In 1995, it entered into a joint venture with Rykodisc. In 1997, it was reported that the two labels had entered into a "wide-ranging agreement" whereby Rykodisc would give money to Slow River to help distribute and market each album that Slow River released.

Notable artists
The Buckets
Richard Buckner, whose 1993 debut album Bloomed was reissued by Slow River in 1999
Charlie Chesterman of Scruffy the Cat
Ed's Redeeming Qualities
Future Bible Heroes
Juicy
Josh Rouse
Tom Leach
Lincoln '65
Sparklehorse
Lauren Hoffman
Chuck E. Weiss

References

Record labels established in 1993
1993 establishments in Massachusetts
Defunct record labels of the United States
Record labels based in Massachusetts
Companies based in Essex County, Massachusetts